Ilmastalu is a village in Kuusalu Parish, Harju County in northern Estonia. It is located on the 43rd km of Tallinn–Narva road (part of E20), just east of Kuusalu. Ilmastalu has a population of 31 (as of 1 January 2012).

References

Villages in Harju County